Miss Michoacán is a beauty pageant held in Michoacán, Mexico, that selects that state's representative for the national Miss Mexico Organization pageant.El estado tiene una ganadora, Karolina Vidales, Miss Mexico 2020 y top 6 en Miss World .

Title holders
Below are the names of the annual titleholders of Miss Michoacán and their final placements in the Miss Mexico Organization.

Color key

Beauty pageants in Mexico
Michoacán
2016 establishments in Mexico